Takanori Suzuki (鈴木 尚典, born April 10, 1972 in Hamamatsu, Japan) is a former Nippon Professional Baseball outfielder.

External links

1972 births
Living people
People from Hamamatsu
Japanese baseball players
Nippon Professional Baseball outfielders
Yokohama Taiyō Whales players
Yokohama BayStars players
Japanese baseball coaches
Nippon Professional Baseball coaches
Baseball people from Shizuoka Prefecture